Juan Pascual de Mena (1707 in Villaseca de la Sagra – 16 April 1784, in Madrid) was a Spanish sculptor in the Neoclassical style.

Life and work 
When he was barely five years old, his family moved to Madrid. He began his studies there and soon made contact with the foreign sculptors, mostly French, who worked at decorating the Royal buildings, and was exposed to new styles originating in Italy, transmitted by Spaniards studying in Rome; notably Felipe de Castro. It is not, however, known with whom he studied. In 1730, he married Josefa Fernández Pillado. 

He participated in planning the Real Academia de Bellas Artes de San Fernando and, in 1752, when it opened, he was appointed a Lieutenant-Director, becoming the Director of Sculpture in 1762. In 1765, his wife died, leaving him with a young daughter. Three months later, he married Juliana Pérez. In 1771, he was appointed General Director of the Academia. He was named an Academician of Merit at the Real Academia de Bellas Artes de San Carlos in 1768.

He was very prolific. His most notable sculpture in marble is the Fountain of Neptune, from a design by Ventura Rodríguez. Notable is a bust of King Charles III and several statues of previous kings for the Royal Palace of Madrid. Additionally, he provided numerous religious figures for institutions such as the Church of San Jerónimo el Real, the Church of San Marcos, and the Church of San Martín in Torrecilla en Cameros. As one of his last works, he participated in decorating the altar at Toledo Cathedral, but there has been some difficulty distinguishing his contributions from those of the other artists involved. The project was left unfinished at his death.

He also sculpted in wood. Many of his works have been incorrectly attributed to his contemporary, Luis Salvador Carmona; a problem complicated by the fact that few of them are dated.

Sources 
 F. Sánchez Cantón, "Escultura y pintura del siglo XVIII", in Ars XVII, 1965.
 M. E. Gómez Moreno, Breve historia de la escultura española, Imprenta de Blass, 1951.

External links 

 Juan Nicolau Castro, Biography @ the Diccionario Biográfico Español, Real Academia de la Historia

1707 births
1784 deaths
Spanish sculptors
Spanish male sculptors
Religious sculptures
People from the Province of Toledo